Oulx-Cesana-Claviere-Sestriere is a railway station in Oulx. The station is located on the Turin-Modane railway. The train services are operated by Trenitalia and SNCF.

Train services
The station is served by the following services:

High speed services (TGV) Paris - Lyon - Chambéry - Turin - Milan
Turin Metropolitan services (SFM3) Bardonnechia - Bussoleno - Turin

Bus services

Bus to Briançon
Bus to Sestriere
Bus to Montgenevre
Bus to Sauze

References

External links

Railway stations in the Metropolitan City of Turin
Oulx